Dr. Harikrishna Prasad Gupta Agrahari (born 25 February 1950, Parsauni Bhatta, Nepal) is a   Hindi and Nepali language poet in the modern generation of Hindi poetry. He is known for his contribution in Nepali as well as Hindi literature. He completed Bachelor of Science and received a doctorate of philosophy degree from India and Hungary. His research letter was rewarded by Budapest University, Hungary. Gupta has published almost the two dozen of his books in various genres.

Here is a Ghazal of his:

References

1950 births
Hindi-language poets
Hindi-language writers
Living people
People from Sitamarhi district
Indian male poets
20th-century Indian poets
Poets from Bihar
20th-century Indian male writers